Stapfiella ulugurica is shrub native to Rwanda, Tanzania, and Zaïre, Africa. It is found at altitudes of 1900–2100 meters.

S. ulugurica grows up to 1 - 2.5 meters tall. It has yellow flowers and black seeds.

References 

Passifloraceae